Jawahar Navodaya Vidyalaya, Mungeshpur or locally known as JNV Mungeshpur is a boarding, co-educational school located in North West district of Delhi in India. Navodaya Vidyalayas are funded by the Indian Ministry of Human Resources Development and administered by Navodaya Vidyalaya Smiti, an autonomous body under the ministry.

History 
The school was established in 1987, and is a part of Jawahar Navodaya Vidyalaya schools, which provide free boarding and education to gifted students. This school is administered and monitored by Jaipur regional office of Navodaya Vidyalaya Smiti.

Affiliations 
JNV Mungeshpur is affiliated to Central Board of Secondary Education with affiliation number 2740001.

See also 
 Jawahar Navodaya Vidyalaya, Jaffarpur Kalan
 List of JNV schools

References

External links
 Official website of JNV Mungeshpur

High schools and secondary schools in Delhi
Jawahar Navodaya Vidyalayas in Delhi
Educational institutions established in 1987
1987 establishments in Delhi